BAP Arica (SS-36) is one of two Type 209/1100 submarines ordered by the Peruvian Navy on 24 June 1970. She was built by the German shipbuilder Howaldtswerke Deutsche Werft AG at its shipyard in Kiel. She is named after the naval battle of Arica, an engagement between naval forces of Peru and Chile on 7 June 1880. Following sea trials in the North Sea, she arrived to its homeport of Callao in 1975. After almost a decade in service she was overhauled in Kiel between 1983 and 1984 for further use.

Sources
Baker III, Arthur D., The Naval Institute Guide to Combat Fleets of the World 2002-2003. Naval Institute Press, 2002.
Ortiz Sotelo, Jorge, Apuntes para la historia de los submarinos peruanos. Biblioteca Nacional, 2001.

1974 ships
Type 209 submarines of the Peruvian Navy
Ships built in Kiel